Johannes Jacobus "Jan" Gregoor (April 9, 1914 – May 20, 1982) was a Dutch painter and art educator. His works were extensively exhibited in art galleries and museums throughout the Netherlands. He taught art at the Design Academy Eindhoven, alongside Kees Bol.

Gregoor was born in The Hague, where he studied at the Dutch Royal Academy of Art. During World War II, he put his art skills in service of the Dutch resistance, when (sometimes along with Max Velthuijs) he forged stamps in identity papers of people in hiding. His work concentrated among others on urban  and industrial landscapes. Among his many students were Helen Berman, Frans Clement, Els Coppens-van de Rijt, Jan Dibbets, and Hans van Vroonhoven. His brother, Nol Gregoor, was a famous Dutch art critic and essayist.

References

External links
Jan Gregoor page at the Dutch Office for Art History Documentation (includes references in Dutch Art History Books)

1914 births
1982 deaths
20th-century Dutch painters
Dutch male painters
Art educators
Royal Academy of Art, The Hague alumni
Academic staff of Design Academy Eindhoven
People from North Brabant
Artists from The Hague
Dutch resistance members
20th-century Dutch male artists